The Ariau Towers is an abandoned boutique hotel, 60 km northwest of Manaus, Brazil, on the Rio Negro, a major tributary of the Amazon River. The concept for the property was that of Dr. Francisco Ritta Bernardino. The property featured 6 towers, with all 291 rooms elevated from the rain forest floor by approximately 10-20m and connected by approximates  of catwalks. Amenities included two restaurants and three swimming pools.

The hotel complex was one of the oldest and largest jungle lodges in the Amazon.  It became known for its luxury accommodations and celebrity guests.  Describing it as "the ultimate treehouse", travel writer Patricia Schulz included the hotel as one of her "1,000 Places to See Before You Die". On the other hand, the editors of Frommer's South America severely criticized the hotel for its "mass-market" offerings and its lack of environmental sensitivity, calling it "all that is wrong with Amazon 'ecotourism'". The hotel closed down in 2016.

Structure 
The hotel has 288 units split amongst apartments, suites (located in the towers) and tree houses. The tallest of the units, the Tarzan House, is built on top of a living mahogany tree, at the height of 22 m from the ground. There are also restaurants serving regional foods, bars and convenience stores.

Activities 
The hotel had various tours available within the forest, such as canoe walk, jungle walk, piranha fishing, visit to native's houses, and observation of nightlife animals.  Visitors could also observe the Meeting of the Waters, where the Rio Negro and the Solimoes River meet, but because of density and different temperatures don't get mixed. The separate shades of water run side by side for a length of more than four miles (6 km) without mixing. Macaws and various breeds of native and non-native monkeys are common around the towers.

Closure 
In 2015, the government seized the property and planned to sell it to pay off its debt, with an asking price of US$8.3 million. A news item in May 2017 stated that the property would be sold by auction in September of that year with a suggested price of US$2.3 million, and a minimum bid of 2 million. A real estate listing in August 2019 indicated that the property was then for sale for €2.5 million. The description provided these specifics:The Ariaú closed the doors in 2016, despite the abandonment, the facilities still impress, with an architecture totally adapted to the forest and the river ... with all the advances would make this hotel again a unique hotel worldwide.

References

External links
 Ariau Amazon Towers' website
 Ariau Amazon Towers Hotel website

Hotels in Brazil
Buildings and structures in Amazonas (Brazilian state)
Rio Negro (Amazon)
Tourist attractions in Amazonas (Brazilian state)